Barmaid is a 1922 German silent film directed by Johannes Guter and starring Xenia Desni, Paul Hartmann, and Charlotte Ander.

The film's sets were designed by the art director Erich Czerwonski.

Cast

References

Bibliography

External links

1922 films
Films of the Weimar Republic
Films directed by Johannes Guter
German silent feature films
UFA GmbH films
German black-and-white films